Liberty Hills may refer to

 Liberty Hills (Antarctica), a line of hills in West Antarctica
 Liberty Hills, Indiana, United States

See also
Liberty Hill (disambiguation)